Warwick Ventures is a University technology commercialisation office of the University of Warwick, in Coventry, United Kingdom.

History 
The company was set up as an academic department within the University of Warwick by Ederyn Williams in 2000. In 2010 it was spun-out as a separate company to manage the intellectual property portfolio belonging to the University. The business development managers employed by the company work with academic inventors at the University to identify, protect and develop intellectual property (IP) resulting from their research.  This IP is then commercialised through licensing and the formation of spin-out companies.

Warwick Ventures provides researchers with commercial advice, funds patent applications and legal costs, and negotiates third-party licences and spin-out company agreements. It then manages the resultant patent portfolio, and seeks to license patents and technologies to companies who invest in developing and selling the products.

As of 2010, the company had made more than 100 patent applications, founded 49 companies, and allegedly raised over £30 million in funding for those companies from venture capitalists and business angels, and the company's founder received a Queen's Award for Enterprise Promotion for individual achievement.

Patents, licensing, and spin-outs 

Spin-out companies from Warwick Ventures include:
 Base 4 Innovation, a Cambridge-based company developing single molecule detection platforms for healthcare and the life sciences
 Molecular Solar, a company that commercialises third-generation solar cell technology developed in an R&D programme at the University of Warwick.
 Allinea Software Ltd, a supplier of software development tools for high performance computing (HPC)
 Warwick Audio Technologies, specialising in the development of flat, flexible loudspeaker technology for original equipment manufacturers.
 Apnee Sehat, a social enterprise that plans lifestyle programmes with a special interest in the British Asian community, trading since 2008.
 Circadian Solar, which develops and deploys concentrator photovoltaic (CPV) systems.
 Recycling Technologies, is developing technologies to produce fuel from mixed plastic waste

Management 
 2011 – present	Quentin Compton-Bishop	(CEO, Warwick Ventures Ltd.)
 2011 – present	Kevin Marks	(COO, Warwick Ventures Ltd.)
 2010 – 2011	Rob Sprawson	(Chief Financial and Commercial Officer Warwick Ventures Ltd.)
 2000–2011 	Ederyn Williams	(Director and Founder of Warwick Ventures; CEO of Warwick Ventures Ltd.)

See also 
 University of Warwick Science Park

References

External links 
 Warwick Ventures
 Warwick Science Park

Innovation in the United Kingdom
Technology companies of the United Kingdom
University of Warwick